Excel Academy is the name of several different schools, including:

Excel Academy (Arvada, Colorado), a charter school in Arvada, Colorado
Excel Academy at Francis M. Wood High School, Baltimore, Maryland
Excel Academy (Conroe, Texas), a boarding school in Conroe, Texas
Excel Academy (San Antonio, Texas), a public school in San Antonio, Texas, operated by the Northside hool District
Excel Academy (Stoke-on-Trent), a secondary school in Staffordshire, England